Lamoral, Count of Egmont, Prince of Gavere (18 November 1522 – 5 June 1568) was a general and statesman in the Spanish Netherlands just before the start of the Eighty Years' War, whose execution helped spark the national uprising that eventually led to the independence of the Netherlands.

Biography
The Count of Egmont was at the head of one of the wealthiest and most powerful families in the Low Countries. Paternally, a branch of the Egmonts ruled the sovereign duchy of Guelders until 1538. Lamoral was born in Château de Lahamaide near Ellezelles.  His father was John IV of Egmont, knight in the Order of the Golden Fleece. His mother belonged to a cadet branch of the House of Luxembourg, and through her he inherited the title prince de Gavere. During his youth, he received a military education in Spain. In 1542, he inherited the estates of his elder brother Charles in Holland. His family's stature increased further in 1544 when, at Spires, in the presence of the Holy Roman Emperor Charles V and of the Archduke Ferdinand I, he married the Countess Palatine Sabine of Simmern, whose brother became the Elector Palatine Frederick III.
By appointment, he was Captain General of the Lowlands under Charles V, knight of the Golden Fleece from 1546, and Imperial Chamberlain. In the service of the Spanish army, he defeated the French in the battles of Saint-Quentin (1557) and Gravelines (1558). Egmont was appointed stadtholder of Flanders and Artois in 1559, aged only 37.

As a leading Netherlandic nobleman, Egmont was a member of King Philip II of Spain's official Council of State for Flanders and Artois. Together with William, Prince of Orange and the Count of Horn,  he protested against the introduction of the inquisition in Flanders by the cardinal Antoine Perrenot Granvelle, bishop of Arras. Egmont even threatened to resign, but after Granvelle left, there was a reconciliation with the king. In 1565, running short of funds as he had continued the representation of the Low Countries entirely from his own pocket, Egmont went to Madrid to beseech Philip II, the king of Spain, for a change of policy in the Netherlands, but met with little more than courtesy.

Soon thereafter, the 'Beeldenstorm' started, the massive iconoclasm of Catholic churches in the Netherlands, and resistance against the Spanish rule in the Netherlands increased. As a devout Catholic, Egmont deplored the iconoclasm, and remained faithful to the Spanish king.

After Philip II sent the Duke of Alba to the Netherlands, William of Orange decided to flee Brussels. Having always declined to do anything that smacked of lèse majesté, Egmont refused to heed Orange's warning; thus he and Horn decided to stay in the city. Upon arrival, Alba almost immediately had the counts of Egmont and Horn arrested on charges of heresy, and imprisoned them in a castle in Ghent, prompting Egmont's wife and their eleven surviving children (from the thirteen they had together) to seek refuge in a convent. Pleas for amnesty came to the Spanish king from throughout Europe, including from many reigning sovereigns, the Order of the Golden Fleece (both being knights of the Order, and thereby theoretically immune from trial by any but their peers of the Order), and the king's kinsman the Emperor Maximilian II, all to no avail.

Execution and destruction of Castle Egmond

On 4 June Egmont and Horn were condemned to death, and lodged that night in the King's House in Brussels. On 5 June 1568 both men were beheaded before the Town Hall on the Grand-Place/Grote Markt (Brussels' main square), Egmont's uncomplaining dignity on the occasion being widely noted. Their deaths led to public protests throughout the Netherlands, and contributed to the resistance against the Spaniards. 

The Count of Egmont lies buried in a crypt in Zottegem, a Belgian city in which Egmont is remembered by his two statues, his museum and his castle. His castle in Egmond aan den Hoef was destroyed in 1573 and a statue in his memory is erected on the site of the ruins.

A statue erected on the Square du Petit Sablon/Kleine Zavelsquare in Brussels commemorates the Counts of Egmont and Horn, in historical overview usually mentioned together as "Egmond en Hoorne" and hailed as the first leaders of the Dutch revolt, as the predecessors of William of Orange, who grew to importance and obtained the leadership after their execution, and who was assassinated in 1584 in Delft, having succeeded in liberating parts of The Netherlands in the early years of the Eighty Years' War (1568–1648).

Egmont's offices and vast estates were forfeited upon his execution, escheating to the Prince-Bishop of Liège. By inheritance he had been count of Egmont (or Egmond), prince de Gavre and van Steenhuysen, baron de Fiennes, Gaesbeke and La Hamaide, seigneur de Purmerent, Hoogwoude, Aertswoude, Beyerland, Sottenghien, Dondes, Auxy and Baer. Some of these lands were eventually returned to his heirs by the Bishop, principally in 1600. Despite the taint of treason and the family's impoverishment, his niece Louise of Lorraine-Mercœur, was chosen to become the Queen consort of Henry III of France in 1575.

Literary treatments

The Count of Egmont is the main character in a play by Goethe, Egmont. In 1810 Ludwig van Beethoven composed the Egmont Overture an overture and incidental music for a revival of the play.

Images

Notes and references

External links

1522 births
1568 deaths
Lamoral
Princes of Gavre
Lamoral
Lords of Purmerend
Lords of Purmerland and Ilpendam
Lords of Hoog- en Aartswoude
Lords of Sotteghem
Lords of Armentières
Lords of Oud-Beijerland
Knights of the Golden Fleece
Dutch people of the Eighty Years' War (United Provinces)
Spanish generals
Military leaders of the Italian Wars
People executed by Spain by decapitation
Executed Dutch people
Dutch Roman Catholics